Matthew Gillespie (24 December 1869 – 1947) was a Scottish footballer whose regular position was as a forward. Born in Bridgeton, Glasgow, he played for Thistle, Blackburn Rovers, Accrington, Leith Athletic, Lincoln City and Newton Heath. His younger brother Billy was also a footballer – they were teammates at Lincoln and played on opposite sides in the Manchester derby.

References

1869 births
1947 deaths
Scottish footballers
People from Bridgeton, Glasgow 
Leith Athletic F.C. players
Lincoln City F.C. players
Manchester United F.C. players
Accrington F.C. players
Blackburn Rovers F.C. players
Date of death missing
Association football forwards
Footballers from Glasgow
English Football League players
Scottish Football League players